Basango Mboliasa Airport  serves the town of Kiri in Mai-Ndombe Province, Democratic Republic of the Congo.

See also

Transport in the Democratic Republic of the Congo
List of airports in the Democratic Republic of the Congo

References

External links
 FallingRain - Basango Mboliasa Airport
 OpenStreetMap - Kiri
 OurAirports - Basango Mboliasa Airport
 

Airports in Mai-Ndombe Province